Wilton High School is a public high school in Wilton, Connecticut, U.S., considered "one of Connecticut's top performers" in various measures of school success in 2007, including scores on standardized mathematics and reading tests. In 2016, U.S. News & World Report ranked Wilton as the 7th best public high school in Connecticut and 386th in the United States.

The school's present, permanent location did not open until 1971. Since then, the school has experienced rapid population growth. From the height of the 1970s to 2006, the student body grew by 7.5 times. In fall 2001, a major multimillion-dollar construction project was completed, significantly expanding the square footage of the school. Enrollment increased by 29 percent from 2001 to 2006.

The school's current principal is Robert O'Donnell, who in 2011 replaced long-time-principal Timothy H. Canty, himself a Wilton graduate. Canty was involved in several high-profile free speech disputes with students before transferring to the Board of Education for two years and then announcing his departure from the school district in 2013.

Demographics
The demographics of the school are unusual for Connecticut. Historically, compared to other high schools in the state, the student body of Wilton High School has been more affluent and substantially Caucasian:

The most recent statistics published by the state for the student population of the district as a whole for the academic year 2015–16

History of secondary education in town

Before 1959
Even though Wilton became an independent town in 1802, separating from Norwalk, its education system was highly unorganized until the late 1950s.

In the early and mid-20th century, Wilton students went to high schools in Westport, New Canaan, Norwalk (until 1930), Danbury and Ridgefield. Since the schools in these communities were becoming overcrowded with population growth, a regional high school for Wilton was proposed in 1935 but was vetoed by the state governor. In the following year, Wilton, Weston and Redding began a joint study, which rejected the idea again. Instead, the committee recommended that Wilton wait for population to increase enough to support a high school and, in the meantime, buy enough land for the school. In 1940, a town meeting approved the purchase of the Harbs Farm property, a  tract near the intersection of School and Danbury Roads. In 1944, a regional high school was proposed again and again the idea was rejected, this time by the town of Redding, which killed the proposal. A consultant hired by Wilton town officials recommended in 1948 that town population growth could support a high school in less than a decade. The regional high school idea was then permanently dropped.

Before the 1959 academic year, all students seeking public secondary school education had to attend Staples High School in Westport. In 1951, Westport officials, facing their own town's population growth, notified Wilton that it should prepare to remove its high school students from that town's school by 1957. In 1956, 10th-grade students began attending classes in the Wilton Junior High School building and 11th-grade students joined them there in fall 1957, so that only Wilton's seniors were at the Westport high school. In that final school year for Wilton students in Westport, the top two graduating seniors at Staples High School were from Wilton. A $1.2 million wing was completed for the junior high school building in fall 1958.

High School shuffle (1959-1971)
In 1962, the public secondary education building moved again. This time, the destination was a brand new structure currently known as Middlebrook School. The first graduating class of this new high school, the class of 1963, numbered 170. Overall enrollment that year was 615. Although this was a new facility, it was quickly deemed inappropriate due to its small size, in the wake of the "baby boomer" education era.

In 1966, a building committee was created to expand the new high school building, but the group recommended that the town instead buy land to the northwest of the high school building and in 1967, the town approved the idea. The land was condemned but the property owners appealed to the courts, delaying the project. Temporary classrooms were set up outside the old high school building. The town approved $12.6 million for the building and the new structure was built to hold 1,500 students, with the possibility of expansion to hold 2,000.

The present day Wilton High School opened in September 1971, reaching a maximum student population of 1,646 during the 1976-77 academic year. WHS has graduated nearly 12,500 students up to the 2006-07 academic year.

Recent history

A Better Chance
Starting in 1996, Wilton High School participated in the A Better Chance (formerly called ABC) program, which brought minority students from inner-city schools to live in town and attend the school. From 2004, A Better Chance leased the former Goslee House at 6 Godfrey Place from the town library for student housing.

Later construction
In 2001, two extensive additions to the school were completed, as well as other renovations. The project included new classrooms, more modern science laboratories, new music rooms, a larger cafeteria and a new theater building with an 800-seat auditorium.

Controversies

Treatment of special needs students
In 2007, the state of Connecticut enacted legislation preventing physical restraint or seclusion of special needs students, except in limited situations, largely as a result of allegations of mistreatment of four special education students in Wilton High School and other Wilton schools in 2005. Jill Ely claimed that, without notifying her, the school forced her intellectually disabled son into a room at the high school that was held shut until he became completely quiet. She said that her son injured his arm trying to get out and once, she later learned, "he was left crying and whimpering for almost the entire day." An investigation by the Wilton Bulletin in 2006 found that the high school "safe room" had never been inspected by the fire marshal and lacked a Building Department certificate of occupancy. Maryanne Lombardi made similar claims that her 9-year old autistic son, who did not speak, was routinely sent to a "padded cell called the timeout room" at another Wilton school. Gloria Bass, the grandmother of two special needs students, also said that one child had been restrained for months in a storage closet without her knowledge. Superintendent Gary Richards defended the schools’ actions, saying, "We do the best we can with kids who sometimes are very challenged."

Free speech
In March 2007, a controversy arose that achieved national prominence when the principal, Timothy Canty, on the objection of a student, cancelled an original student play by an advanced theater class concerning the Iraq War, a project he had originally approved. He justified his action by claiming it might hurt Wilton families "who had lost loved ones or who had individuals serving as we speak," and that there was not enough classroom and rehearsal time to ensure it would provide "a legitimate instructional experience for our students." The play, Voices in Conflict, had been written and produced by students under the direction of Bonnie Dickinson, an English teacher with 13 years' experience. It was supposed to have been performed in school during the day. School officials, including Superintendent Gary Richards, notwithstanding national attention over the cancellation and a letter protesting signed by Stephen Sondheim, Edward Albee, Christopher Durang, John Guare and John Patrick Shanley, refused to allow the production to be performed at the school.

Theater groups rallied to the students’ defense and the play was subsequently performed at the Fairfield Theatre Company, The Vineyard Theatre, The Culture Project and The Public Theater. The play was produced for Connecticut Public Television and Dickinson became the official 2007 Honoree of the National Coalition Against Censorship and the winner of the Connecticut Center for First Amendment Rights' 2007 "Freedom Award."

Sports

Boys' lacrosse
Since the sport gained school-sponsorship, the team has won 21 Connecticut state championships and 13 FCIAC titles. In 2011, they were ranked 64th in the nation by LaxPower.

Girls' lacrosse
The girls' lacrosse team won 13 FCIAC titles in 15 years, as well as several state championships.  In 2001 the Warriors won their first state title, over rival Darien.

Notable alumni

 Jeremy Black  actor, best known for his role in The Boys from Brazil
 Paul Dano  actor best known for his roles in The Girl Next Door, Little Miss Sunshine and There Will Be Blood
 Lydia Hearst-Shaw  supermodel, heiress, socialite and daughter of Patty Hearst
 Sam Hyde  comedian, writer and actor
Daniel Kellogg  American composer
 Kristine Lilly  soccer player; the high school's north field was named after her.
 Buffy Neuffer  journalist for the Boston Globe
 Mike Pressler  lacrosse coach
 Simon Rosenberg (class of 1981)  founder and president of New Democrat Network, a think tank.
 John Scofield  jazz guitarist, attended the school in the late 1960s.
 Frank Sesno  CNN journalist and professor of media and public affairs at The George Washington University.
 Dan Shevchik  1999 Pan American games Bronze Medalist.
 Brit & Alex Smith  child actors who appeared at the age of three in the soap opera One Life to Live.
 Zachary Cole Smith  frontman of DIIV.
 Donald Verrilli  United States Solicitor General.
 Emily Weiss  founder of the cosmetics company Glossier and the blog Into the Gloss

References

External links
 

Buildings and structures in Wilton, Connecticut
Schools in Fairfield County, Connecticut
Educational institutions established in 1971
Public high schools in Connecticut
1971 establishments in Connecticut